Hypostomus variostictus is a species of catfish in the family Loricariidae. It is native to South America, where it occurs in the upper Paraguay River basin in Argentina and Brazil. The species reaches 5.7 cm (2.2 inches) in total length and is believed to be a facultative air-breather.

References 

variostictus
Fish described in 1912